Acinetobacter rudis is a Gram-negative, strictly aerobic bacterium from the genus Acinetobacter isolated from raw milk and wastewater.

References

External links
Type strain of Acinetobacter rudis at BacDive -  the Bacterial Diversity Metadatabase

Moraxellaceae
Bacteria described in 2011